Savaş Polat (born 14 April 1997) is a Turkish footballer who plays for Düzcespor.

Club career
He made his debut for the first team of Fenerbahçe on 2 December 2014 in the Turkish Cup match against Kayserispor which they lost 2–1.

References

External links

Profile at Turkish Football Federation

1997 births
People from Muş
Living people
Turkish footballers
Turkey youth international footballers
Turkey under-21 international footballers
Association football defenders
Fenerbahçe S.K. footballers
Konyaspor footballers
1922 Konyaspor footballers
Giresunspor footballers
Adanaspor footballers
Turgutluspor footballers
TFF First League players
TFF Second League players